Calanthe rubens is a species of orchid. It is native to the Philippines, Thailand and Malaysia and generally grows at elevations above 300 feet. It is warm growing and deciduous, commencing growth in spring and flowering in autumn.

References

rubens
Orchids of Malaysia
Orchids of Thailand
Orchids of the Philippines
Plants described in 1890